Cookstown/Tally-Ho Field Aerodrome  is located  northwest of Cookstown, Ontario, Canada.

References

Registered aerodromes in Ontario